Roslyn is a locality in the Upper Lachlan Shire, New South Wales, Australia. It lies about 20 km east of Crookwell and 37 km north of Goulburn. Roslyn railway station was a junction station on the now disused Crookwell railway line from 1902 to 1974 and the disused Taralga railway line from 1926 to 1957.

References

Upper Lachlan Shire
Localities in New South Wales
Southern Tablelands